Peritapnia minima is a species of beetle in the family Cerambycidae. It was described by Chemsak and Linsley in 1978.

References

Acanthoderini
Beetles described in 1978